Silvana Agostoni is a Mexican-Italian visual artist whose work is known for her photographs exploring issues of the body, identity and landscape.  Her work has been exhibited throughout the United States and internationally. She lives and works in Minneapolis and Mexico City.

Early life 
Agostoni was born into a creative family and raised in Mexico City, Mexico. Her father, Jorge Agostoni, was an architect from Italy, who played a major role in the planning and design of key museums in Mexico and other parts of the world since the 1960s, including the Museo Nacional de Antropologia in Mexico City and the Olympic Museum in Switzerland. Her mother, Lucille Urencio, was a Mexican actress.

Education 
Agostoni was driven to study photography as soon as she finished high school. She spent two years taking photography classes at Escuela Activa de Fotografía to get her certification as a professional photographer. Afterwards, she obtained her Bachelor of Fine Arts in Graphic Design at Universidad Autónoma Metropolitana in Mexico City. Following the completion of her bachelor’s degree, she moved to New York City to get her Master of Fine Arts in Photography, Video and New Media at The School of Visual Arts New York City (SVA NYC).

Career 
Agostoni’s art focuses on landscapes, represented in both the body and the world and how they transform and behave over time. She has produced multiple large-scale photographic series, video projects, and published two photographic books based on her works Traces and White. Many of her works also discuss the effects of climate change on the environment and the nature of humans’ contact with the world. In her series involving the human body as a landscape, she also tackles concepts surrounding how to identify the self with the body, unfamiliarity, and the body as a map.

The large-scale photographic series, On Veils, takes a look at natural elements such as mist, fog, and steam to create bodies of art that represent dramatic and transformational sceneries. Many of the images in the series examine environmental forces as a way to simplify physical space and make it serene.

Traces is a project depicting ephemera taken at a former penitentiary in Mexico. The images are re-interpretations of icons and remnants left behind, creating an illusion of presence.

Topografias is a series of photographs that depict close up images of the human body, in which the contours of body’s skin translate the self into a map. The prints capture small snippets of skin, nails, and hair. Agostoni critiques visual determinism by showing diverse intersectional bodies defined by nationality, gender, and so on.

Sistema Nacional de Creadores de Arte Fellowship 
In 2019, Agostoni began the Sistema Nacional de Creadores de Arte Fellowship, a three-year program sponsored by the National Fund for Arts and Culture in Mexico. Issues addressed in the works of her fellowship include the themes presented in White among others that portray the natural world. In her photographic practice, she also considers the differences between her photographs of physical landscapes and 19th century landscape photography. In 2021, she collaborated with Springboard for the Arts to discuss what art she makes while in isolation during the U.S. quarantine period.

Selected exhibitions

References 

Mexican people of Italian descent
Mexican photographers
21st-century Mexican women artists
Year of birth missing (living people)
Living people